Charles Palmer may refer to:

 Charles Palmer (1777–1851), Member of Parliament for Bath
 Sir Charles Palmer, 1st Baronet (1822–1907), English shipbuilder, businessman and Liberal Member of Parliament, 1874–1907
 Sir Charles Palmer, 2nd Baronet (1771–1827)
 Charlie Palmer (chef), American chef
 Charles Palmer (cricketer) (1919–2005), English cricketer and cricket administrator
 Charles Palmer (director) (born 1965), British television director
 Charles Palmer (engineer) (1847–1940), survivor of the siege of Lucknow
 Charlie Palmer (footballer) (born 1963), retired professional footballer in England
 Charles Palmer (judoka) (1930–2001), British judoka
 Charles Palmer (sport shooter) (1869–?), British Olympic sport shooter
 Charles Palmer (banker), Governor of the Bank of England, 1754–1756

 Charles D. Palmer (1902–1999), U.S. Army general
 Charles Forrest Palmer (1892–1973), Atlanta real estate developer, head of housing authority and chamber of commerce
 Charles Palmer (journalist) (1869–1920), British Member of Parliament for The Wrekin, 1920
 Charles Fyshe Palmer, British Member of Parliament for Reading
 Charles John Palmer (1805–1882), English historian
 Charles M. Palmer (1856–1949), American Midwest newspaper broker

See also 
 Charles Nicholas Pallmer (1772–1848), British Member of Parliament